NY-3 may refer to:
 Consolidated NY-3, an aircraft
 New York's 3rd congressional district
 New York State Route 3